Superintendent is the title given to a person who is a leader of a Christian denomination at the regional or national level in some  Protestant denominations.

Lutheran usage
This title has been used in Lutheranism since 1527 for pastors leading a denomination at the regional level. The office was similar to that of bishop, but instead of being ordained by the archbishop, the superintendent was appointed by the Crown. This new model of ecclesiastical polity was partly political, as the Roman Catholic bishops before the Reformation held considerable political power and often used it against the king. Superintendents' loyalty was supposed to lie with the head of the church, the monarch. Some Lutheran theologians also considered the term less Catholic and therefore preferable to 'bishop'.

Presbyterian usage
The Presbyterian Church of Scotland's First Book of Discipline of 1560 provided for Scotland to be divided into ten dioceses with superintendents.

Methodist usage 

The term "Superintendent" is used for several varying positions in Methodism worldwide since 1784. In the American sense, specifically within the United Methodist Church, the title is used not to refer to a minister who is equivalent to a bishop but to the supervisor of a district, which is a regional subdivision below an episcopal area (equivalent to a diocese). According to the Book of Discipline of the United Methodist Church, 

In the British Methodist Church and its offshoots, a Superintendent is a minister who serves in a supervisory position over a Methodist Circuit (a small group of churches to which ministers are appointed).

The term Superintendent evolved in Britain before the death of Methodist founder John Wesley and was a description of the responsibilities of some of his Assistants (a role which later evolved into what is now known as ordained presbyteral ministry).

Pentecostal usage 
In some Pentecostal denominations, the title is used, such as Assemblies of God since 1914, regionally and nationally.

References

Ecclesiastical titles
Religious leadership roles